Jordanoleiopus villiersi is a species of beetle in the family Cerambycidae. It was described by Lepesme and Breuning in 1953.

References

Polymistoleiopus
Beetles described in 1953
Taxa named by Stephan von Breuning (entomologist)
Taxa named by Pierre Lepesme